Ogunode is a surname of Nigerian origin. Notable people with the surname include:

Femi Ogunode (born 1991), Nigerian-Qatari sprinter
Tosin Ogunode (born 1994), Nigerian-Qatari sprinter, brother of Femi

Surnames of Nigerian origin